Juan Carlos Cobián (1888–1953) was an Argentine bandleader and tango composer. He led the "evolutionary" tendency in tango which was perceived as tending to concert music than to traditional dance music.

References

1888 births
1942 deaths